The Cask is a 1920 detective novel by the Irish-born writer Freeman Wills Crofts. His debut novel, it is considered his masterpiece. Long after the author's reputation had declined, this book was still hailed by critics as a cornerstone of the genre  Crofts had been working as a railway engineer before writing the novel, but its success launched him as one of the leading writers of the Golden Age of Detective Fiction. He later went on to create the character of Inspector French of Scotland Yard who appeared in a long-running series of novels.

References

Bibliography
 Evans, Curtis. Masters of the "Humdrum" Mystery: Cecil John Charles Street, Freeman Wills Crofts, Alfred Walter Stewart and the British Detective Novel, 1920-1961. McFarland, 2014.
 Herbert, Rosemary. Whodunit?: A Who's Who in Crime & Mystery Writing. Oxford University Press, 2003.
 Reilly, John M. Twentieth Century Crime & Mystery Writers. Springer, 2015.

1920 British novels
Novels by Freeman Wills Crofts
British crime novels
British mystery novels
British detective novels
William Collins, Sons books
Novels set in London
1920 debut novels